Pigeon Township is one of eight townships in Vanderburgh County, Indiana, United States.  As of the 2010 census, its population was 29,799 and it contained 15,434 housing units. Downtown Evansville is located entirely within the township.

Pigeon Township was established in 1818.

Geography

Cities, towns, villages
 Evansville (south-central portion)

Adjacent townships
 Indiana
 Vanderburgh County
 Center Township (northeast)
 Knight Township (east)
 Perry Township (west)

Airports and landing strips
 Deaconess Hospital Airport
 Welborn Memorial Baptist Hospital Airport

Rivers
 Ohio River
 Pigeon Creek

School districts
 Evansville-Vanderburgh School Corporation

Political districts
 Indiana's 8th congressional district
 State House District 75
 State House District 76
 State House District 77
 State Senate District 49

References
 
 United States Census Bureau 2007 TIGER/Line Shapefiles
 IndianaMap

External links

Townships in Vanderburgh County, Indiana
Townships in Indiana